Dosirak, also known as  gwakpap refers to a packed meal, often for lunch. It usually consists of bap (cooked rice) and several banchan (side dishes). The lunch boxes, also called dosirak or dosirak-tong (dosirak case), are typically plastic or thermo-steel containers with or without compartments or tiers. Dosirak is often home-made, but is also sold in train stations and convenience stores.

During this period, Korean cuisine adopted foreign cuisines as well as Japanese food items such as bento or sushi rolled in sheets of seaweed, popularized in Korea under the name of gimbap.

Varieties 
Home-made dosirak is often packed in tiered lunch boxes that can separate bap (cooked rice) and banchan (side dishes). The guk (soup) tier, if included, is usually kept warm by insulation.  Plastic or thermo-steel containers are most common, but combinations of wood and lacquer, ceramics and bamboo, as well as other materials, are also used.

Yennal-dosirak ("old-time dosirak") consists of bap (rice), stir-fried kimchi, egg-washed and pan-fried sausages, fried eggs, and shredded gim (seaweed), typically packed in a rectangular lunchbox made of tinplate or German silver. It is shaken with the lid on, thereby mixing the ingredients prior to eating. 

Gimbap-dosirak ("packed gimbap"), made with sliced gimbap (seaweed rolls), is often packed for picnics.

Gallery

See also 
 Bento (弁当)
 Biandang (便當)
 Lunch box
 Packed lunch
 Tiffin

References 

Academic meals
Food combinations
Food storage containers
Korean cuisine
Serving and dining